Microneta viaria is a species of sheetweb spider in the family Linyphiidae. It is found in North America, Europe, Turkey, North Africa, the Caucasus, a range within Russia (European to Far East), China, Mongolia, Korea, and Japan.

References

External links

 

Linyphiidae
Articles created by Qbugbot
Spiders described in 1841